Babalon  (also known as the Scarlet Woman, Great Mother or Mother of Abominations) is a goddess found in the occult system of Thelema, which was established in 1904 with the writing of The Book of the Law  by English author and occultist Aleister Crowley. The spelling of the name as "Babalon" was revealed to Crowley in The Vision and the Voice. Her name and imagery feature prominently in Crowley's "Liber Cheth vel Vallum Abiegni". 

In her most abstract form, Babalon represents the female sexual impulse and the liberated woman. In the creed of the Gnostic Mass she is also identified with Mother Earth, in her most fertile sense. Along with her status as an archetype or goddess, Crowley believed that Babalon had an earthly aspect or avatar; a living woman who occupied the spiritual office of the "Scarlet Woman". This office, first identified in The Book of the Law is usually described as a counterpart to his own identification as "To Mega Therion" (The Great Beast). The role of the Scarlet Woman was to help manifest the energies of the Aeon of Horus. Crowley believed that several women in his life occupied the office of Scarlet Woman, for which see the list below. 

Babalon's consort is Chaos, called the "Father of Life" in the Gnostic Mass, being the male form of the creative principle. Chaos appears in The Vision and the Voice and later in Liber Cheth vel Vallum Abiegni. Separate from her relationship with her consort, Babalon is usually depicted as riding the Beast. She is often referred to as a sacred whore, and her primary symbol is the chalice or graal.

As Crowley wrote in his The Book of Thoth, "she rides astride the Beast; in her left hand she holds the reins, representing the passion which unites them. In her right she holds aloft the cup, the Holy Grail aflame with love and death. In this cup are mingled the elements of the sacrament of the Aeon".

Origins

Whore of Babylon

The Whore of Babylon is referred to in several places in the Book of Revelation, a book which may have had an influence on Thelema, as Aleister Crowley says he read it as a child and imagined himself as the Beast. She is described in Chapter 17:3-6:

Aleister Crowley recorded his view of the Book of Revelation in The Vision and the Voice.

Great Mother
Within the Gnostic Mass, Babalon is mentioned in the Gnostic Creed:

Here, Babalon is identified with Binah on the Tree of Life, the sphere that represents the Great Sea and such mother-goddesses as Isis, Bhavani, and Ma'at. Moreover, she represents all physical mothers. Bishops T. Apiryon and Helena write:

Enochian magic
Another source is from the system of Enochian magic created by Dr. John Dee and Sir Edward Kelley in the 16th century. This system is based upon a unique language, Enochian, two words of which are certainly relevant. The first is BABALOND, which is translated as harlot. The other is BABALON, which means wicked. Some flavour of context in which they appear can be found in a communication received by Dee and Kelley in 1587:

Gateway to the City of Pyramids (12th Aethyr)

Within the mystical system of the A∴A∴, after the adept has attained the Knowledge and Conversation of his Holy Guardian Angel, he then might reach the next and last great milestone — the crossing of the Abyss, that great spiritual wilderness of nothingness and dissolution. Choronzon is the dweller there, and its job is to trap the traveler in his meaningless world of illusion.

However, Babalon is just on the other side, beckoning. If the adept gives himself totally to her — the symbol of this act being the pouring of the adept’s blood into her graal — he becomes impregnated in her, then to be reborn as a Master of the Temple and a saint that dwells in the City of the Pyramids. From Crowley's book Magick Without Tears:

and from The Vision and the Voice (12th Aethyr):

She is considered to be a sacred whore because she denies no one, and yet she extracts a great price — the very blood of the adept and their ego-identity as an earthly individual. This aspect of Babalon is described further from the 12th Aethyr:

Babalon's daughter (9th Aethyr) 

One of the most extensive descriptions by Crowley of Babalon's daughter is to be found in The Vision and the Voice, 9th Aethyr, quoted in The Book of Thoth:

Cup of Babalon (5th Aethyr)
The concept contained within this aspect of Babalon is that of the mystical ideal, the quest to become one with all through the annihilation of the earthly ego ("For as thy blood is mingled in the cup of BABALON, so is thine heart the universal heart."). The blood spilling into the graal of Babalon is then used by her to "flood the world with Life and Beauty" (meaning to create Masters of the Temple that are "released" back into the world of men), symbolized by the Crimson Rose of 49 Petals.

In sex magic, the mixture of female sexual fluids and semen produced in the sexual act with the Scarlet Woman or Babalon is called the elixir of life. Another alternative form of this elixir is the Elixir Rubeus consisting of the menstrual blood and semen (abbreviated as El. Rub. by Crowley in his magical diaries), and is referred to as the "effluvium of Babalon, the Scarlet Woman, which is the menstruum of the lunar current" by Kenneth Grant.

Office of the Scarlet Woman
Although Crowley often wrote that Babalon and the Scarlet Woman are one, there are also many instances where the Scarlet Woman is seen more as a representative or physical manifestation of the universal feminine principle. In a footnote to Liber Reguli, Crowley mentions that of the "Gods of the Aeon," the Scarlet Woman and the Beast are "the earthly emissaries of those Gods." In The Vision and the Voice, he wrote "This is Babalon, the true mistress of The Beast; of Her, all his mistresses on lower planes are but avatars." In The Law is for All, he writes:

Individual scarlet women 
Aleister Crowley believed that many of his lovers and magical companions were playing a cosmic role, even to the point of fulfilling prophecy. The following is a list of women that he considered to have been (or might have been) scarlet women (quotes are from The Law is for All):

Rose Edith Crowley, Crowley's first wife. —Put me in touch with Aiwas; see Equinox 1, 7, "The Temple of Solomon the King."  Failed as elsewhere is on record.
Mary d'Este Sturges —Put me in touch with Abuldiz; hence helped with Book 4. Failed from personal jealousies.
Jeanne Robert Foster —Bore the "child" to whom this Book refers later. Failed from respectability.
Roddie Minor —Brought me in touch with Amalantrah. Failed from indifference to the Work.
Marie Rohling —Helped to inspire Liber CXI. Failed from indecision.
Bertha Almira Prykrl —Delayed assumption of duties, hence made way for No. 7.
Leah Hirsig —Assisted me in actual initiation; still at my side, An XVII, Sol in Sagittarius.

See also
 Babalon Working
 Barbelo
 Ceremonial magic
 Great Work
 Karmamudra
 Magical formula
 The Thunder, Perfect Mind

References

Citations

Works cited

Primary sources

Secondary sources

Further reading

 

Love and lust goddesses
Magic words
Mother goddesses
New religious movement deities
Thelema
Whore of Babylon